Sarajevo City Hall (Bosnian, Croatian and Serbian: Gradska vijećnica Sarajevo / Градска вијећница Сарајево), known as Vijećnica, is located in the city of Sarajevo, Bosnia and Herzegovina. It was designed in 1891 by the Czech architect Karel Pařík, but criticisms by the minister, Baron Béni Kállay, caused him to stop working on the project. It was initially the largest and most representative building of the Austro-Hungarian period in Sarajevo and served as the city hall.

The building was reopened on 9 May 2014. It is the current seat and headquarters of the Mayor of Sarajevo, as well as the Sarajevo City Council.

History

Alexander Wittek, who worked on the project in 1892 and 1893, fell ill and died in 1894 in Graz, and the work was completed by Ćiril Iveković. The edifice was built in a stylistic blend of historical eclecticism, predominantly in the pseudo-Moorish expression, for which the stylistic sources were found in the Islamic art of Spain and North Africa.

Building works began in 1892 and were completed in 1894, at a cost of 984,000 crowns, with 32,000 crowns provided for fixtures and fittings. It was formally opened 20 April 1896, and handed over to the City Authority, which occupied the property until 1949, when it was handed over to the National and University Library of Bosnia and Herzegovina.

On 25 August 1992, Serbian shelling during the Siege of Sarajevo caused the complete destruction of the library; among the losses were about 700 manuscripts and incunabula and a unique collection of Bosnian serial publications, some from the middle of the 19th century Bosnian cultural revival. Before the attack, the library held 1.5 million volumes and over 155,000 rare books and manuscripts. Some citizens and librarians tried to save some books while they were under sniper fire, at least one person died.

The majority of the books could not be saved from the flames. The structural repair of the building was planned to be carried out in four stages: 1996–1997 (financed by a donation from Republic of Austria), and 2000–2004 (financed by a donation from the European Commission), and the city of Barcelona among others. The third stage ended in September 2012, with an estimated cost of KM 4.6 million (about €2.37 million) and will return the city hall to its former grace. The fourth stage began following the completion of the third stage and lasted about 20 months, finishing at the end of 2013 and cost of KM 14 million (about €7.23 million) which are secured through the IPA. In this stage the entire interior of the building was rebuilt and reconstructed (paintings, sculptures, books), resulting in the library being brought back to its pre-war condition. Everything that was possible to restore has been done so, while those things that were not possible to save have been made anew through special molds. The whole reconstruction and restoration process was predicted to cost about KM 25 million (about €13 million).

After it was repaired, the building, now a national monument, has been used for variety of events. Its space has been be used for various protocol events for all levels of government, concerts and exhibitions.

Renewal
After years of restoration, the building was reopened on 9 May 2014, with the performance of the Sarajevo Philharmonic Orchestra and Vedran Smailović, as well as a 3D projection video mapping by Knap Studio Sarajevo. In 2022 it was the subject of a stop-motion animated film directed by artist Nicholas F. Callaway, through the research project Imaneo, with funding from Creative Europe.

See also
National and University Library of Bosnia and Herzegovina
Gimnazija Mostar, also built in Moorish Revival style
List of destroyed libraries
National Museum of Bosnia and Herzegovina
Oriental Institute in Sarajevo

References

External links

 - UDK 930.25:355.4](497.6)"1992/1995" - god. 42(1999), str. 223-230

Bosnia and Herzegovina culture
Buildings and structures in Sarajevo
Moorish Revival architecture in Bosnia and Herzegovina
Rebuilt buildings and structures in Bosnia and Herzegovina
National Monuments of Bosnia and Herzegovina
Seats of local government
Book burnings
Siege of Sarajevo
Buildings and structures demolished in 1992
Stari Grad, Sarajevo